The 2008 Southeastern Conference baseball tournament was held at Regions Park in Hoover, AL from May 21 through 25. LSU won the tournament and earned the Southeastern Conference's automatic bid to the 2008 NCAA Division I baseball tournament.

Regular Season Results
The top eight teams (based on conference results) from the conference earned invites to the tournament.

Format
The 2008 tournament will feature a "flipped bracket" for the first time.  This means that after two days of play the undefeated team from each bracket will move into the other bracket.  This reduces the number of rematches teams will have to play in order to win the tournament.

Tournament

* Game went into extra innings.
Tennessee, Arkansas, Mississippi State, and Auburn did not make the tournament.

All-Tournament Team

See also
College World Series
NCAA Division I Baseball Championship
Southeastern Conference baseball tournament

External links
2008 SEC Baseball Tournament @ SECSports.com

References

Tournament
Southeastern Conference Baseball Tournament
Southeastern Conference baseball tournament
Southeastern Conference baseball tournament
College sports tournaments in Alabama
Baseball competitions in Hoover, Alabama